Armstrong County Courthouse and Jail is a historic courthouse complex located at Kittanning, Armstrong County, Pennsylvania.   The courthouse was built between 1858 and 1860, and is a two-story, brick and stone building measuring 105 feet by 65 feet.  It has a hipped roof topped by an octagonal cupola and bell.  It features a portico with four Corinthian order columns in Greek Revival style.  A three-story rear addition was built in 1951-1953.  The jail building was built between 1870 and 1873.  It is constructed of stone, brick, and iron, and measures 114 feet by 50 feet, with a 96 feet tall tower.  The building once housed 24, 8 foot by 13 foot cells.

It was listed on the National Register of Historic Places in 1981.

See also
List of state and county courthouses in Pennsylvania

References

County courthouses in Pennsylvania
Courthouses on the National Register of Historic Places in Pennsylvania
Greek Revival architecture in Pennsylvania
Government buildings completed in 1860
Buildings and structures in Armstrong County, Pennsylvania
National Register of Historic Places in Armstrong County, Pennsylvania
Kittanning, Pennsylvania